Chahuán is a surname, and may refer to;

Nicolás Chahuán Nazar - founder of Unión La Calera

Arabic-language surnames
Surnames of Chilean origin
Surnames of Palestinian origin